Johanna Peiponen (born 18 December 1990) is a Finnish long-distance runner. She competed in the 10,000 metres at the 2016 European Athletics Championships.

References

External links

1990 births
Living people
Finnish female long-distance runners
Place of birth missing (living people)
Athletes (track and field) at the 2016 Summer Olympics
Olympic athletes of Finland